is a Japanese manga series written by Issei Eifuku and illustrated by Junichi Nōjō, based on the novel Shōwashi by Kazutoshi Handō. It has been serialized in Shogakukan's seinen manga magazine Big Comic Original since April 2017.

Development 
Editor-in-chief of Big Comic Original Nakaguma Ichirō first thought of the idea of a manga about the Imperial Family after watching the 2006 film The Queen. He noted that mangaka have not worked on this theme before, as in Japan it is generally considered taboo to speak about the imperial family in such a familiar fashion. As Japan suffered greatly during World War II, he wanted to depict the Emperor's feelings and personal situation at the time, and also felt that Japanese readers would also like to know about him.

Publication
Shōwa Tennō Monogatari, written by Issei Eifuku and illustrated by Junichi Nōjō, based on the novel Shōwashi by Kazutoshi Handō, started in Shogakukan's seinen manga magazine Big Comic Original on April 20, 2017. Shogakukan has collected its chapters into individual tankōbon volumes. The first volume was released on October 30, 2017. As of October 28, 2022, eleven volumes have been released.

Volume list

Reception
As of 2019, the series has sold over 140,000 copies. Shōwa Tennō Monogatari ranked 6th on Takarajimasha's Kono Manga ga Sugoi! 2019 ranking of Top 20 manga for male readers. The series was nominated for the 43rd Kodansha Manga Award for the Best General Manga category in 2019. The series was nominated for the 68th Shogakukan Manga Award in the general category in 2022.

References

External links
 

Cultural depictions of Hirohito
Historical anime and manga
Seinen manga
Shogakukan manga
Shōwa period in fiction